Babaroga is the fourth studio album by Serbian singer Ceca. It was released in 1991. The album's title is derived from a horned witch in Slavic folklore called "Baba Roga", who kidnaps and eats misbehaving children at night.

Track listing
All music by Dobrivoje Ivanković, except tracks 3 and 9 (Miroljub Kemiš).  All lyrics as noted.
Babaroga (Lyrics: Ivanković) 
Volim te (Lyrics: Ilonka Tadić)
Izbriši, vetre, trag (Lyrics: Stevica Spasić)
Hej, vršnjaci (Lyrics: Mirjana Bukovčić Trišić)
Sto put' sam se zaklela (Lyrics: Ivanković)
Da si nekad do bola voleo (Lyrics: Marija Nikolić)
Ne kuni majko (Lyrics: Violeta Mićović) 
Bivši (Lyrics: Dragan Stodić)
Mokra trava (Lyrics: Milada Zeković)

References

1991 albums
Ceca (singer) albums